Hunted is an American reality TV series based on the UK TV series of the same name. It ran on CBS from January 22 to March 1, 2017.

Premise
The show is a competition series that centers on nine teams of two as they are fugitives on the run from highly skilled investigators. Each pair attempts to use their wits to evade capture for 28 days in a 100,000-square-mile region in the southeastern United States in order to win the grand prize of $250,000.

Premiere
Hunted premiered on January 22, 2017, on CBS after the 2017 AFC Championship Game.

Contestants

Investigators

Command Center
Robert W. Clark
Commander, FBI (Ret.)

Intelligence

Theresa PaytonHead of Intelligence, Former White House CIO
Ben OwenSenior Analyst, MI5 (Former) & Hunter on Hunted UK

Intelligence Analysts
Steve MastersonIntelligence Analyst, Naval Intelligence (Former)
Connie MinIntelligence Analyst, CIA (Former)
Aki PeritzIntelligence Analyst, CIA (Former)
Zaira PirzadaIntelligence Analyst, Academia

Cyber Analysts
Myke ColeCyber Analyst, USCG
Charles DeBarberCyber Analyst, US Army Cyber Intelligence (Former)
Landon StewartCyber Analyst, US Army/NSA (Former)
Dr. Max WachtelForensic Psychologist, Behavioral Profiler

Operations 
Lenny DePaulHead of Operations, US Marshals (Ret.)
Ryan 'Ry Phi' PhillipsOperations Supervisor, SWAT
Andrew StumpfOperations Supervisor, Navy SEAL (Ret.)

Hunters

 Team Alpha
John "Buck" SmithUS Marshals (Ret.)
Walter "Griff" GarrisonDetective (Ret.)

 Team Bravo
Jermaine FinksDepartment of Homeland Security
Chad LightUS Army Special Forces (Former)

 Team Charlie
Evy PoumpourasUS Secret Service
Maureen O'ConnellFBI (Ret.)

 Team Delta
Jacquie BainerPrivate Investigator
Paul RossiUSN (Former)

 Team Echo
Allison "Alli" PaganettiUS Army
Jonathan GomezUS Army Rangers

 Team Foxtrot
Muhammad 'Shadow' BilalUS Army Special Forces (Ret.)
Cortice MilesDetective

 Team Golf
John PiccianoDetective
Vinny SenzamiciUS Marshals (Former)

 Team Hotel
Nick "Klem" KlementowiczSWAT
Sam PhillipsSWAT

 Team India
Amanda FryEl Paso Police Department
Roxanne LopezDetective

Episodes

Production 
The show was filmed without the assistance of government or law enforcement. Each episode ends with a disclaimer stating that 'while the investigative techniques shown are real, some procedures have been replicated for broadcast.'

Some information the hunters obtained — such as the Enterprise rental agreement and the car's location — came from the production itself, provided to the hunters when they requested it. Also, participants granted access in advance to their personal records, homes and phones, and then that information was meted out to the hunters the same way it would have been during an actual investigation.

There was a clear firewall between the hunter team and fugitive team. The production team did considerable research to ensure that the requests and receipt of information simulated what would happen in the real world, such as waiting for a subpoena. Additionally, the hunters had to make proper requests, and were sometimes denied information by the production team.

Hunted was picked up by Channel 4 in the UK, but renamed Hunted USA to avoid confusion with the UK version.

References

External links
 

2017 American television series debuts
2017 American television series endings
2010s American reality television series
CBS original programming
American television series based on British television series
English-language television shows
Television series by Endemol
Television shows filmed in Alabama
Television shows filmed in Florida
Television shows filmed in Georgia (U.S. state)
Television shows filmed in South Carolina